The women's long jump at the 2008 Summer Olympics took place on 19 and 22 August at the Beijing National Stadium.

The qualifying standards were 6.72 m (A standard) and 6.60 m (B standard).

Summary
In the qualifying round, Blessing Okagbare was the last qualifier, jumping 6.59m on her final attempt to knock bot Tatyana Kotova and triple jump bronze medalist, Hrysopiyí Devetzí out of the final by 2 cm.  #1 qualifier Brittney Reese jumped 6.65m as the first jump in the final, which held up for five jumps until Tatyana Lebedeva jumped 6.97m.  Four more jumps later, Maurren Maggi's  winner was the only jump of the competition to best Lebedeva.  The penultimate jumper Chelsea Hammond jumped 6.79m, then the 19 year old Okagbare hit a 6.91m.  Those first round jumps settled the competition.  Only Lebedeva was able to improve with a 7.03m final attempt, but it was still 1 cm short of capturing gold.

In 2017, retests showed Tatyana Lebedeva had a positive test for turinabol and was disqualified from both her silver medals. The IOC requested that the IAAF modify the results, and, after CAS dismisses the appeal of Tatyana Lebedeva, the medals were redistributed accordingly. Blessing Okagbare was advanced to silver, and Chelsea Hammond was advanced to bronze.

Records
Prior to this competition, the existing world and Olympic records were as follows:

No new world or Olympic records were set for this event.

Results

Qualifying round
Qualifying performance 6.75 (Q) or at least 12 best performers (q) advance to the final.

Q - Qualified by right / q - Qualified by result / NM - No Mark / NR - National Record / SB - Season Best / DSQ - Disqualified

Final
22 August 2008 - 19:20

References

Athletics at the 2008 Summer Olympics
Long jump at the Olympics
2008 in women's athletics
Women's events at the 2008 Summer Olympics